Khin Ma Ma Maw (13 December 1905 – 1967), also known as Consort Maw, was the first nanyinwun kadaw of British Burma, as the wife of Premier Ba Maw. Ba Maw being inaugurated as the Naingandaw Adhipati (lit. 'paramount ruler of the State') of the State of Burma, Maw served as the first lady of the State of Burma from 17 May 1942 to 27 March 1945.

Biography
Maw was born on 13 December 1905, to middle-class parents, and married Ba Maw on 5 April 1926. She became the first nanyinwun kadaw when her husband became the Premier of British Crown Colony of Burma. When Japan succeeded in occupying most of Burma, she plotting her husband to escaped from the prison, who was detained for high treason in Mogok Prison by the British government in 1940. Because of her efforts, he released in June 1942.

 
When Ba Maw was proclaimed the naingandaw adhipadi (head of state) during the Japanese occupation in Burma, she became the first lady and was known as Consort Maw. Thereafter she started to practice some of royal court system in her mansion. On January 12, 1943, she established a volunteer organization. The volunteers helped clear rubble from the streets and worked in the hospitals.

Ba Maw allowed her to be involved in appointing some government positions; Ba Maw made decisions on the political affairs taking her thoughts into consideration.

Edward Michael Law-Yone, a journalist and official, wrote in his article Dr. Ba Maw of Burma, after having an interview with Maw, that she, "destined to found virtually a dynasty, was a slim, dainty person with attributes complementing those of her husband."

When the Japanese lost the war, her family were forced to retreat to Indochina and Japan. In the post-war period, some Maws were arrested. She died in 1967 at the age of 62.

Note

See also
List of premiers of British Burma
Ngahtaung-ser Kadaw

References 

1905 births
1967 deaths
Spouses of prime ministers of Myanmar
Spouses of national leaders